The Bernthsen acridine synthesis is the chemical reaction of a diarylamine heated with a carboxylic acid (or acid anhydride) and zinc chloride to form a 9-substituted acridine.

Using zinc chloride, one must heat the reaction to 200-270 °C for 24hrs.  The use of polyphosphoric acid will give acridine products at a lower temperature, but also with decreased yields.

References

Nitrogen heterocycle forming reactions
Heterocycle forming reactions
Name reactions